Amelanchier australis is a plant species native to Mexico and New Mexico. Some sources consider this to be the same species as A. utahensis but The Plant List regards the two as distinct.

Flowers are born in a raceme of 6–15 flowers at the end of branches.

References

australis
Flora of Mexico
Flora of New Mexico
Plants described in 1913